The 2021–22 Coastal Carolina Chanticleers men's basketball team represents Coastal Carolina University in the 2021–22 NCAA Division I men's basketball season. The Chanticleers, led by 15th-year head coach Cliff Ellis, play their home games at the HTC Center in Conway, South Carolina as members of the Sun Belt Conference. They finished the season 19-14, 8-8 in Sun Belt Play to finish in 7th place. They lost in the first round of the Sun Belt tournament to Georgia Southern. They received an invitation to the new  The Basketball Classic where they defeated Maryland Eastern Shore, Florida Gulf Coast, and South Alabama to advance to the championship game where they lost to Fresno State.

Previous season
In a season limited due to the ongoing COVID-19 pandemic, the Chanticleers finished the 2020–21 season 18–8, 9–5 in Sun Belt play to finish in second place in the East Division (division play was instituted due to COVID-19 concerns). They defeated Troy in the quarterfinals of the Sun Belt tournament before losing to Appalachian State in the semifinals. They received a bid to the College Basketball Invitational where they defeated Bryant and Stetson to advance to the CBI championship game. There they lost to Pepperdine.

Offseason

Coaching changes 
Assistant coach Patrice Days left the team to join East Tennessee State's coaching staff. The school hired Tallahassee Community College head coach, Zach Settembre, to replace Days.

Departures

Transfers

Recruiting

Roster

Schedule and results
Coastal Carolina's scheduled game against South Alabama on January 8, 2022 was canceled due to COVID-19 protocols within South Alabama's program. The Chanticleers game against UT Arlington scheduled for February 3 was canceled due to freezing rain, ice, and snow in the Arlington area.
|-
!colspan=12 style=| Regular season

|-
!colspan=12 style=| Sun Belt tournament

|-
!colspan=9 style=|The Basketball Classic

Source

References

Coastal Carolina Chanticleers men's basketball seasons
Coastal Carolina Chanticleers
Coastal Carolina Chanticleers men's basketball
Coastal Carolina Chanticleers